A list of horror films released in 1990.

References

Sources

 
 

 

Lists of horror films by year
1990-related lists